WEKA-LD (channel 41) is a low-powered television station in Canton, Ohio, United States, serving Northeastern Ohio, and owned by DTV America Corporation.

History  
The Federal Communications Commission issued the station's initial construction permit for W27DL-D on February 22, 2011. The current WEKA-LD callsign was adopted on April 15, 2015. The station signed on the air in sometime in 2016 as a Newsmax TV affiliate on its main channel. Not too long after WEKA signed on, DTV America signed on WQDI-LD as an Estrella TV affiliate.

Subchannels 
The station's digital signal is multiplexed:

References

External links 
DTV America - official website

Innovate Corp.
Low-power television stations in the United States
EKA-LD
Television channels and stations established in 2016